Teri Baahon Mein (English: In Your Arms) is a 1984 Indian Hindi-language film directed by Umesh Mehra and produced by Pramod Pedder, starring Mohnish Bahl, Ayesha Dutt, Navin Nischol, Prem Chopra, Mac Mohan with Mithun Chakraborty and Parveen Babi in a special appearance. The film is a Hindi remake of the 1980 American film The Blue Lagoon, and stars Mohnish Bahl (son of late Bollywood actress Nutan) and Ayesha Dutt (wife of Bollywood star Jackie Shroff).

Plot 
The story revolves around the characters of Mohnish Bahl and Ayesha Dutt. As kids, their parents Navin and Parveen travel through the sea, and their ship is stranded on an island due to heavy storm. The parents die, and the kids are left to survive on the island all alone. They are later accompanied by an ape Kalu, who becomes their pet. They have to survive harsh climate, and the cannibal people on the island. After 20 years of searching, Parikshit Sahni, Manu's father, succeeds in finding them on the island. He has been searching for them since 20 years, accompanied by his younger brother Prem Chopra. When he finds them, Prem Chopra tries to kill Parikshit, but inturn Manu kills him and get wounded. Manu and Kanchi couldn't survive the attack and die. Parikshit takes Manu's kid back to the city.

Cast

Mohnish Bahl as Manu
Ayesha Dutt as Kanchi
Navin Nischol as Balram Singh
Parikshat Sahni as Manu's father 
Prem Chopra as Ajit Singh
Parveen Babi - Guest Appearance
Dev Kumar
Kalpana Iyer
Mac Mohan

Soundtrack
The music composed by Bappi Lahiri and lyrics by Amit Khanna.

References

External links
 

1984 films
1980s Hindi-language films
Films scored by Bappi Lahiri
Films set on uninhabited islands
Indian remakes of American films
Indian romantic drama films
Indian adventure drama films
Films directed by Umesh Mehra
1980s adventure drama films
1984 romantic drama films